The Football Oscar is an annual football award given by the Croatian Association Football Union and Sportske novosti since 2013. In the 2017 edition the award was renamed as Trophy Footballer. It is awarded to the best football player, manager and goalkeeper playing in the Croatian First League. Also, it is awarded to the best overall Croatian player at the end of every season. The best 11 Prva HNL players of the season are also selected. The award is chosen by players and managers of the Croatian league clubs.

Team of the Year 2013 

Best Croatian player:  Luka Modrić
Best Prva HNL player:  Sammir 
Best Prva HNL goalkeeper:  Ivan Kelava 
Best Prva HNL U-21 player:  Ante Rebić
Best Prva HNL manager:  Tomislav Ivković

Prva HNL Team of the Year 2013 

Source:

Team of the Year 2014 

Best Croatian player:  Luka Modrić
Best Prva HNL player:  Andrej Kramarić 
Best Prva HNL goalkeeper:  Ivan Vargić 
Best Prva HNL U-21 player:  Mario Pašalić
Best Prva HNL manager:  Matjaž Kek

Prva HNL Team of the Year 2014 

Source:

Team of the Year 2015 

Best Croatian player:  Luka Modrić
Best Prva HNL player:  Marko Pjaca 
Best Prva HNL goalkeeper:  Lovre Kalinić 
Best Prva HNL U-21 player:  Marko Pjaca
Best Prva HNL manager:  Zoran Mamić

Prva HNL Team of the Year 2015 

Source:

Team of the Year 2016 

Best Croatian player:  Luka Modrić
Best Prva HNL player:  Marko Pjaca 
Best Prva HNL goalkeeper:  Lovre Kalinić 
Best Prva HNL U-21 player:  Ante Ćorić
Best Prva HNL manager:  Zoran Mamić

Prva HNL Team of the Year 2016 

Source:

Team of the Year 2017 

Best Croatian player:  Luka Modrić
Best Croatian goalkeeper:  Danijel Subašić
Best Prva HNL player:  Franko Andrijašević 
Best Prva HNL U-21 player:  Lovro Majer
Best Prva HNL manager:  Matjaž Kek

Prva HNL Team of the Year 2017 

Source:

Team of the Year 2018 

Best Croatian player:  Luka Modrić
Best Croatian female player:  Maja Joščak
Best Croatian goalkeeper:  Danijel Subašić
Best Prva HNL player:  El Arabi Hillel Soudani 
Best Prva HNL U-21 player:  Lovro Majer
Best Prva HNL manager:  Matjaž Kek

Prva HNL Team of the Year 2018 

Source:

Team of the Year 2019 

Best Croatian player:  Luka Modrić
Best Croatian female player:  Leonarda Balog
Best Croatian goalkeeper:  Dominik Livaković
Best Prva HNL player:  Dani Olmo 
Best Prva HNL U-21 player:  Dani Olmo
Best Prva HNL manager:  Nenad Bjelica
Best Croatian futsal player:  Duško Martinac

Prva HNL Team of the Year 2019 

Source:

Team of the Year 2020

Best Croatian player:  Luka Modrić
Best Croatian goalkeeper:  Dominik Livaković
Best Prva HNL player:  Bruno Petković 
Best Prva HNL U-21 player:  Luka Ivanušec
Best Prva HNL manager:  Nenad Bjelica
Best Prva HNL pitch: Stadion Rujevica

Prva HNL Team of the Year 2020 

Source:

Team of the Year 2021

Best Croatian player:  Luka Modrić
Best Croatian female player:  Izabela Lojna
Best Croatian goalkeeper:  Dominik Livaković
Best Prva HNL player:  Bruno Petković 
Best Prva HNL U-21 player:  Joško Gvardiol
Best Prva HNL manager:  Nenad Bjelica
Best Prva HNL pitch: Stadion Maksimir

Prva HNL Team of the Year 2021 

Source:

Team of the Year 2022

Best Croatian player:  Luka Modrić
Best Croatian goalkeeper:  Dominik Livaković
Best Prva HNL player:  Marko Livaja 
Best Prva HNL U-21 player:  Lukas Kačavenda
Best Prva HNL manager:  Goran Tomić
Best Prva HNL pitch: Stadion Rujevica
Best Prva HNLŽ player:  Aida Hadžić

Prva HNL Team of the Year 2022 

OSI - Petar Bočkaj was transferred from NK Osijek to GNK Dinamo Zagreb during winter break.

Source:

Statistics

Appearance by player

Appearance by club

Appearance by nation

Other awards
Prva HNL Player of the Year (Tportal), given by the Croatian website Tportal, chosen by captains of league clubs.
Croatian Footballer of the Year, given by the Croatian newspaper Večernji list, chosen by sport journalists.
Sportske novosti Yellow Shirt award, given by the Croatian newspaper Sportske novosti, chosen by sport journalists.

References

Croatian football trophies and awards
Awards established in 2013
Annual events in Croatia